The 1966 Bluebonnet Bowl was a college football postseason bowl game between the Texas Longhorns and the Ole Miss Rebels.

Background
Ole Miss finished 4th in the Southeastern Conference for the second straight year in a row. This was the Rebels' 10th straight bowl appearance and first Bluebonnet Bowl since 1964. The Longhorns finished 3rd in the Southwest Conference, attending a bowl game after a two season wait.

Game summary
On the three touchdowns, the Longhorns had drives of 89, 68, and 53 yards, while limiting the Rebels to barely over 200 yards. Bill Bradley started the scoring on his 25 yard touchdown run to give them a 6-0 lead. Ole Miss tried to narrow the lead with a Jimmy Keyes field goal from 43 yards out. However, the kick went wide, keeping it 6-0. Chris Gilbert made it 12-0 in the second half with his touchdown sneak. Later in the quarter, the Rebels were stopped on 4th down at the Longhorn 8. Bradley ran for his second touchdown of the day to make it 19-0, as Texas coasted from there to win. Chris Gilbert ran for 156 yards on
26 carries, while Bradley ran for 105 yards on 20 carries, while passing for 49 yards.

Aftermath
While the Longhorns did not make a bowl game the next season, they made six straight Cotton Bowl Classic appearances, while returning to the Bluebonnet Bowl in 1975. As for Ole Miss, they never returned to the Bluebonnet Bowl, though they kept making bowl games, making four in Vaught's final four seasons.

Statistics

References

Bluebonnet Bowl
Bluebonnet Bowl
Ole Miss Rebels football bowl games
Texas Longhorns football bowl games
Bluebonnet Bowl
December 1966 sports events in the United States